Polly of the Follies is a 1922 American silent romantic comedy film starring Constance Talmadge, Horace Knight, and Thomas Carr. It is presumed to be lost; all that is known to have survived is a trailer. An intertitle from the trailer states that Talmadge plays "a stagestruck country girl who hits New York and strikes Ziegfeld for a job". According to the Internet Movie Database, this was James Gleason's film debut. A trailer for the film was preserved by the Academy Film Archive in 2009.

Plot

The film is a romantic comedy, focusing on the love triangle between Bob Jones, Alysia Potter and Polly Meachum. Originally engaged, Bob and Alysia elope to Bowling Green, Connecticut, where they meet Silas Meachum, a campaigner against motion pictures, and his daughter, Polly. The eloping couple’s family arrive, chasing them, and persuade them to wait to get married. Polly goes to New York to join the Ziegfeld Follies, but is ultimately replaced by Alysia. As Bob consoles Polly, Alysia breaks off the engagement, and Bob and Polly may now marry.

Cast
 Constance Talmadge as Polly Meacham
 Horace Knight as Silas Meacham
 Thomas Carr as Jimmy Meacham
 Harry Fisher as Pop Cummings
 Frank Lalor as Daddy Hood
 George Fawcett as Mr. Jones
 Ina Borke as Mrs. Jones
 Mildred Arden as Hattie Jones
 Kenneth Harlan as Bob Jones
 Paul Doucet as Clarence Hope
 Teresa Maxwell-Conover as Mrs. Potter (credited as Theresa Maxwell Conover)
 Billie Dove as Alysia Potter
 James Gleason as Paul Gordon
 Bernard Randall as Flo Ziegfeld
 John Daly Murphy as Julius Caesar

References

External links

1922 films
American silent feature films
Films directed by John Emerson
Films set in New York City
First National Pictures films
Lost American films
Ziegfeld Follies
American black-and-white films
American romantic comedy films
1922 romantic comedy films
Lost romantic comedy films
1922 lost films
1920s American films
Silent romantic comedy films
Silent American comedy films